Buji Subdistrict is a subdistrict of Longgang District, Shenzhen, Guangdong, China. It was formerly part of Buji Town before August 26, 2004. Located in the northeast part of Shenzhen City, it is served by four metro stations and is home to the city's eastern train station, Shenzhen East railway station.

Major Natural Resources 
 Buji River

Major Communities 
 Gui Fang Yuan
 Dafen Village
 COLI Greenery Villas
 Music Life Garden

Railway Station 
 Shenzhen East railway station

Metro Stations 
 Buji station
 Mumianwan station
 Dafen station
 Danzhutou station

References

External links

 Longgang Government Online: Buji Sub-district Office
 Shenzhen Metro Homepage (English)

Subdistricts of Shenzhen
Longgang District, Shenzhen